Publius Mucius Scaevola may refer to:

 Publius Mucius Scaevola (pontifex maximus) (c. 176 BC – 115 BC)
 Publius Mucius Scaevola (triumphator) (fl. 179–169 BC)

See also
 Mucius Scaevola (disambiguation)